Caney is a city in Montgomery County, Kansas, United States.  As of the 2020 census, the population of the city was 1,788.

History
Caney was founded in 1869. It was named from the Caney River. The first post office in Caney was established in May 1870.

In 1887, the railroad was built through Caney, and in that same year, the town was incorporated.

Caney has long been associated with the petroleum industry in Kansas. In 1906, a major gas well fire took place in this area. In 1909, Caney became the site of the original Kanotex Refining Company. Currently, CVR Energy's pipeline system can transport up to 145,000 barrels/day of crude oil from Caney to that company's refinery in Coffeyville, Kansas.

Geography

Climate
The climate in this area is characterized by hot, humid summers and generally mild to cool winters.  According to the Köppen Climate Classification system, Caney has a humid subtropical climate, abbreviated "Cfa" on climate maps.

Demographics

2010 census
As of the census of 2010, there were 2,203 people, 866 households, and 574 families residing in the city. The racial makeup of the city was 86.2% White, 0.7% African American, 5.8% Native American, 0.2% Asian, 0.1% Pacific Islander, 0.9% from other races, and 6.0% from two or more races. Hispanic or Latino of any race were 5.1% of the population.

There were 866 households, of which 36.3% had children under the age of 18 living with them, 48.2% were married couples living together, 12.8% had a female householder with no husband present, 5.3% had a male householder with no wife present, and 33.7% were non-families. 30.0% of all households were made up of individuals, and 11.8% had someone living alone who was 65 years of age or older. The average household size was 2.48 and the average family size was 3.05.

The median age in the city was 35.9 years. 25.8% of residents were under the age of 18; 9.7% were between the ages of 18 and 24; 24.5% were from 25 to 44; 24.3% were from 45 to 64; and 15.8% were 65 years of age or older. The gender makeup of the city was 48.3% male and 51.7% female.

2000 census
As of the census of 2000, there were 2,092 people, 850 households, and 574 families residing in the city. The racial makeup of the city was 90.44% White, 0.19% African American, 5.59% Native American, 0.10% Asian, 1.39% from other races, and 2.29% from two or more races. Hispanic or Latino of any race were 3.01% of the population.

There were 850 households, out of which 35.4% had children under the age of 18 living with them, 52.8% were married couples living together, 11.3% had a female householder with no husband present, and 32.4% were non-families. 30.1% of all households were made up of individuals, and 15.1% had someone living alone who was 65 years of age or older. The average household size was 2.43 and the average family size was 3.03.

In the city, the population was spread out, with 28.6% under the age of 18, 7.0% from 18 to 24, 27.4% from 25 to 44, 19.8% from 45 to 64, and 17.2% who were 65 years of age or older. The median age was 36 years. For every 100 females, there were 87.1 males. For every 100 females age 18 and over, there were 82.1 males.

The median income for a household in the city was $31,316, and the median income for a family was $40,000. Males had a median income of $29,833 versus $22,917 for females. The per capita income for the city was $17,578. About 6.1% of families and 11.3% of the population were below the poverty line, including 11.5% of those under age 18 and 10.1% of those age 65 or over.

Area events
Mayfest is a yearly gathering to celebrate School Alumni and the town's festivities.

Education
The community is served by Caney Valley USD 436 public school district.

Notable people
 Clancy Hayes, jazz musician
 Kenneth McFarland, educator and superintendent of schools for Topeka at the time of Brown v. Board of Education
 Glenn Shafer, statistician, co-developer of the Dempster-Shafer Theory
 Rosalie Wahl, former associate justice of the Minnesota Supreme Court

References

Further reading

External links
 City of Caney
 Caney - Directory of Public Officials
 Caney Valley Historical Society
 Caney city map, KDOT

Cities in Kansas
Cities in Montgomery County, Kansas
1869 establishments in Kansas
Populated places established in 1869